Mamenan may refer to:
 Mamenan-e Olya
 Mamenan-e Sofla